Barry Assheton-Smith (17 April 1905 – 22 April 1978) was a South African cricketer. He played in four first-class matches for Eastern Province in 1939/40.

See also
 List of Eastern Province representative cricketers

References

External links
 

1905 births
1978 deaths
South African cricketers
Eastern Province cricketers
Cricketers from Durban